Ashland/Lineville Airport  is a county-owned public-use airport located  northeast of the central business district of Ashland, a town in Clay County, Alabama, United States. According to the FAA's National Plan of Integrated Airport Systems for 2009–2013, it is categorized as a general aviation facility.

Facilities and aircraft 
For the 12-month period ending February 12, 2007, the airport had 2,863 general aviation aircraft operations.

References

External links 

Airports in Alabama
Transportation buildings and structures in Clay County, Alabama